Stranger Things: Music from the Netflix Original Series is the non-original composition soundtrack companion to the second season of the Netflix series Stranger Things. The album, which intersperses popular '80s songs with clips from the first and second seasons, was released on October 27, 2017, by Legacy Recordings to coincide with the release of the second season. The album was nominated for Best Compilation Soundtrack for Visual Media at the 61st Annual Grammy Awards, but lost to the soundtrack album for the film The Greatest Showman.

Track listing

Charts

References

Music of Stranger Things
Television soundtracks
2017 compilation albums
2017 soundtrack albums